Fairview Township is a township in Russell County, Kansas, United States. As of the 2010 United States Census, it had a population of 466.

History
Waldo Township was organized from part of Fairview Township in 1904. Luray Township was organized from part of Fairview Township in 1906.

Geography
The center of Fairview Township is located at  (39.0500109, −98.5392339) at an elevation of 1,480 feet (451 m). The township lies in the Smoky Hills region of the Great Plains. Wilson Dam and the extreme eastern end of Wilson Lake lie in the southeastern corner of the township. The Saline River flows northeast out of the county from the dam. One of the river's tributaries, Wolf Creek, runs east-southeast through the township's midsection, fed by its East Fork which flows south through the north-central part of the township. A second tributary of Wolf Creek, Blue Stem Creek, flows north then east from its source in the southwestern part of the township.

According to the United States Census Bureau, Fairview Township occupies an area of 71.83 square miles (186 km2) of which 71.28 square miles (184.6 km2) is land and 0.55 square miles (1.44 km2) is water. Located in northeastern Russell County, it includes the city of Lucas, which is located in the central part of the township, and it borders Osborne County's Delhi Township and Lincoln County's Cedron Township to the north, Lincoln County's Hanover and Pleasant Townships to the east, Lincoln County's Highland Township to the southeast, Plymouth Township to the south, Center Township to the southwest, and Luray Township to the west.

Demographics

As of the 2010 census, there were 466 people, 226 households, and 132 families residing in the township. The population density was 6.5 people per square mile (2.5/km2). There were 296 housing units at an average density of 4.2 per square mile (1.6/km2). The racial makeup of the township was 97.9% White, 0.6% Asian, 0.2% American Indian, 0.6% from some other race, and 0.6% from two or more races. Hispanics or Latinos of any race were 1.3% of the population.

There were 226 households, out of which 21.7% had children under the age of 18 living with them, 50.9% were married couples living together, 1.8% had a male householder with no wife present, 5.8% had a female householder with no husband present, and 41.6% were non-families. 40.3% of all households were made up of individuals, and 19.5% had someone living alone who was 65 years of age or older. The average household size was 2.06, and the average family size was 2.76.

In the township, the population was spread out, with 20.6% under the age of 18, 5.2% from 18 to 24, 16.7% from 25 to 44, 31.3% from 45 to 64, and 26.2% who were 65 years of age or older. The median age was 51.3 years. For every 100 females, there were 92.6 males. For every 100 females age 18 and over, there were 86.9 males age 18 and over.

Transportation
Kansas Highway 18 (K-18), an east–west route, runs southeast–northwest through the central part of the township. Kansas Highway 232 (K-232), a north–south route, enters the township's southeast corner from the south, turns northwest, and crosses Wilson Dam before turning north once again and finally terminating at its junction with K-18. Kansas Highway 181 (K-181) terminates in the southeast corner of the township at its junction with K-232. In addition, a network of mostly unpaved county roads is laid out in a rough grid pattern across the township. North Road, also called 202nd Street, is a paved north–south road that runs north from K-18 to the county line.

References

Townships in Russell County, Kansas
Townships in Kansas